Geneviève Termier (2 April 1917 – 27 May 2005) was a French paleontologist and evolutionist. She was a research director at the French National Centre for Scientific Research.   In 1942 she went to Morocco where she met her husband Henri. Their son Michel was born three years later. She specialized in the study of gastropods. She also studied the South-East Asian Permian brachiopods. Together with her husband Henri Termier, she is considered one of the greatest French paleontologist of the 20th century. Geneviève Termier suffered from a long and painful illness, and on 27 May 2005 in Saint-Rémy-lès-Chevreuse, near Paris, she died at 88 years of age.

Selected bibliography 
 Paléontologie marocaine - 5 volumes
 Histoire géologique de la biosphère
 Formation des continents et progression de la vie
 L'évolution de la lithosphère
 Quelques faits paléogéographiques et paléoécologiques relatifs à la limite de l'antécambrien et du cambrien 
 Bryozoaires du paléozoïque supérieur de l'afghanistan
 Réflexions sur la sédimentation marine dans ses rapports avec l'érosion continentale
 Generalites sur les invertebres fossiles 
 La trame géologique de l'histoire humaine 
 Initiation à la paléontologie
 Sur la partie inférieure du flysch crétacé du djurjura - all with Henri Termier

References and external links 

 Obituary, with a photo and bibliography

1917 births
2005 deaths
French paleontologists
Women paleontologists
French women geologists
20th-century French women scientists